Agnes Irwin may refer to:

 Agnes Irwin (educator)  (1841–1914), the first dean of Radcliffe College
 Agnes Irwin School, a college prep school in Rosemont, Pennsylvania, founded in 1869 by the educator